Scott Inlet is a body of water in the Qikiqtaaluk Region of Nunavut, Canada. It is an arm of Baffin Bay. Scott Island lies in its middle. At its south end, it splits into Clark and Gibbs Fiords.

Geography
The habitat is characterized by steep cliffs, mostly bare, those some have grassy-turfed ledges that rise on both sides.

Fauna
Northern fulmars found here represent about 3.2% of the Canadian population. Breeding glaucous gulls represent about 1% of the Canadian population. This has earned the inlet and its surrounds, including Scott Island, a designation as an Important Bird Area (No. NU070), as well as Key Migratory Bird Terrestrial Habitat Site designation by the Canadian Wildlife Service. Polar bears, harp seals, ringed seal, and walrus frequent the area.

References

Bodies of water of Baffin Bay
Inlets of Baffin Island
Important Bird Areas of Qikiqtaaluk Region
Important Bird Areas of Arctic islands
Seabird colonies